Soeuria is a monotypic genus of Seychelloise spitting spiders containing the single species, Soeuria soeur. It was first described by Michael I. Saaristo in 1997, and is found on the Seychelles.

See also
 List of Scytodidae species

References

Monotypic Araneomorphae genera
Scytodidae
Spiders of Africa